The women's pentathlon event at the 1967 Pan American Games was held in Winnipeg on 29 and 30 July. It was the first time that women's combined events were held at the Games.

Results

References

Athletics at the 1967 Pan American Games
1967